Chisocheton polyandrus, of the Mahogany Family (Meliaceae), is a species of pachycaulous, unbranched trees variously called "palmoids", "maypole trees" or "Corner Model Trees" (after Prof. E.J.H. Corner who was the first to describe them as an architectural growth form) occurring among several families of unrelated trees. In mature leaves the oldest pair may die when a new pair is formed. The unbranched inflorescences are up to 6.5 feet (two meters) long with the flowers occupying just the last foot (30 cm) or so, eventually hanging straight down as the weight of the fruit increases. The flowers are tubular,  in length. Petals 5 or 6, white with red blush and having up to 14 stamens. The fruit has three seeds, each covered with a red aril.

References 

polyandrus